The Ministry of Construction, Transportation and Infrastructure of the Republic of Serbia is the ministry in the Government of Serbia which is in the charge of construction, transportation and infrastructure. The current minister is Goran Vesić, in office since 26 October 2022.

History
The Ministry of Construction, Transportation and Infrastructure was established on 11 February 1991.

The Ministry of Construction and Urbanism which existed from 1991 to 2004, and from 2012 to 2014, merged into the Ministry of Construction, Transportation and Infrastructure.

Sectors
There are several sectors operating within the Ministry:
 Sector for road transport, roads and traffic safety
 Sector for railways and intermodal transport
 Sector for air traffic
 Sector for water transport and navigation safety
 Sector for building and construction land
 Sector for spatial planning, urbanism and housing
 Sector for international cooperation and European integration
 Sector for strategic planning and management of infrastructure projects
 Sector for inspection control

Subordinate institutions
There are several agencies and institutions that operate within the scope of the Ministry:
 Republic Geodetic Authority 
 Port Authority 
 Directorate for Railways 
 Agency for Traffic Safety 
 Directorate for Determination of the ships ability for navigation 
 Directorate for Waterways

List of ministers
Political Party:

See also
 Transport in Serbia

References

External links
 
 Serbian ministries, etc – Rulers.org

Construction, Transportation and Infrastructure
1991 establishments in Serbia
Ministries established in 1991
Serbia
Serbia
Serbia
Transport organizations based in Serbia